The DNa inscription (acronym for ) is a famous Achaemenid-era inscription located in Naqsh-e Rostam, Iran.

Content
The inscription mentions the conquests of Darius the Great and his various achievements during his life. Its exact date is not known, but it can be assumed to be from the last decade of his reign.

Like several other inscriptions by Darius, the territories controlled by the Achaemenid Empire are clearly listed.

The nationalities mentioned in the DNa inscription are otherwise vividly illustrated through the large sculptural relief on the upper registers of all the tombs, including that of Darius I, at Naqsh-e Rustam. One of the best preserved is that of Xerxes I.

Script
The inscription is written in the Old Persian cuneiform, a nearly alphabetical, simple form of the ancient cuneiform scripts (36 phonetic characters and 8 logograms), which was specially designed and used by the early Achaemenid rulers from the 6th century BCE.

Full inscription
The full inscriptions consists in two parts, the first one being related to a description of the lineage of Darius, as well as a list of the countries under his rule. The second part is more religious in nature and related to the cult of Ahuramazda.

Specific country names
The DNa inscription records the various territories under the rule of Darius I.

References

5th-century BC inscriptions
Achaemenid inscriptions
Darius the Great